Akinci may refer to:

People
 Bülent Akinci, Turkish-German director and script writer
 Halil Akıncı, Turkish diplomat
 Mustafa Akıncı, Northern Cyprus president

Other uses
 Akıncı, irregular light cavalry of the Ottoman Empire's military
 Akıncı Air Base, Air Force base in Ankara, Turkey
 Bayraktar Akıncı, Turkish unmanned aerial vehicle under development

Turkish-language surnames